Glendalough Upper Lake is a glacial lake near Glendalough, County Wicklow, Ireland.

Geography 

The lake is located in the Wicklow Mountains area west of Glendalough Early Medieval monastic settlement. Near the southern shore stands a small rectangular church named Temple-na-Skellig, only accessible by boat and a series of steps from the landing stage; a nearby cliff hosts a cave called St. Kevin's bed, reputedly a retreat for St. Kevin and later for St. Laurence O'Toole.

Geology 
The lake is classified as a ribbon lake. The Upper and the Lower lake were at first united but one of their inflow brought an amount of sediment large enough to divide the original lake in two parts.

Hiking 
Close to the eastern tip of the lake passes the Wicklow Way, a long distance waymarked walking trail, on its way from Rathfarnham in the north to its southerly point of Clonegal.

Nature conservation 

The Upper Lake is part of the Wicklow Mountains National Park. Among the plants living near the coast can be cited the white waterlily and the broad-leaved pondweed. Some of its shore is occupied by a marsh with horsetail, bottle sedge and common reed, which is a convenient place to spot dragonflies.

See also 

List of loughs in Ireland

References

External links

 Water Sports in the area

Lakes of County Wicklow